The 2014 Stan Wawrinka tennis season began at the Chennai Open, where he won the title for the second time in his career. This was followed by victory at the Australian Open, where he defeated defending champion Novak Djokovic in the quarterfinals, followed by victory over world no. 1 Rafael Nadal in the final, to win his first ever Grand Slam title, launching him to a career-high no. 3 in the world, and the Swiss no. 1 (ahead of Roger Federer) for the first time in his career. Additionally, he won his first Masters 1000 title, defeating compatriot Federer in the final after coming back from a set down. During the first half of the season, Wawrinka went a perfect 6–0 against top-10 opponents, including wins against three of the "Big Four" (Djokovic, Nadal, and Federer). He also reached the semifinals of the ATP World Tour Finals for the second time in a row and finished the year helping Switzerland win their first Davis Cup.

He was defending champion in Oeiras, but withdrew before the tournament began.

All matches
This table chronicles all the matches of Stan Wawrinka in 2014, including walkovers (W/O) which the ATP does not count as wins. They are marked ND for non-decision or no decision.

Singles matches

Doubles matches

Exhibition matches

Tournament Schedule

Singles schedule

 Note – for the purposes of year end totals, the four Majors and eight ATP 1000 events must be counted. Then the next six best results will be added, seven if a player makes the Year End Championships. Any other results are not counted in the final

Yearly records

Head-to-head matchups
Stan Wawrinka had a  match win–loss record in the 2014 season. The following list is ordered by number of wins:

 Marin Čilić 3–0
 Benjamin Becker 2–0
 Tomáš Berdych 2–0
 Tommy Robredo 2–0
 Édouard Roger-Vasselin 2–0
 Aljaž Bedene 1–0
 Marcos Baghdatis 1–0
 Thomaz Bellucci 1–0
 Alejandro Falla 1–0
 David Ferrer 1–0
 Fabio Fognini 1–0
 Daniel Gimeno Traver 1–0
 Denis Istomin 1–0
 Ivo Karlović 1–0
 Dušan Lajović 1–0
 Feliciano López 1–0
 Yen-hsun Lu 1–0
 Marinko Matosevic 1–0
 Rafael Nadal 1–0
 Benoît Paire 1–0
 Vasek Pospisil 1–0
 Sam Querrey 1–0
 Milos Raonic 1–0
 Pere Riba 1–0
 Andreas Seppi 1–0
 João Sousa 1–0
 Jo-Wilfried Tsonga 1–0
 Jiří Veselý 1–0
 Novak Djokovic 1–1
 Andrey Golubev 1–1
 Mikhail Kukushkin 1–1
 Dominic Thiem 1–1
 Roger Federer 1–2
 Julien Benneteau 0–1
 Grigor Dimitrov 0–1
 Alexandr Dolgopolov 0–1
 Guillermo García López 0–1
 Tommy Haas 0–1
 Tatsuma Ito 0–1
 Kei Nishikori 0–1
 Gilles Simon 0–1
 Kevin Anderson 0–3

Finals

Singles: 3–0

Team competitions: 1-0

Earnings

 Figures in United States dollars (USD) unless noted.

See also
 2014 ATP World Tour
 2014 Roger Federer tennis season
 2014 Rafael Nadal tennis season
 2014 Novak Djokovic tennis season
 2014 Andy Murray tennis season
 2014 Marin Čilić tennis season

External links
2014 Schedule at ATP World Tour

Wawrinka
Wawrinka
2014 in Swiss tennis
2014 in Swiss sport